Grange University Hospital is a new Specialist Critical Care Centre at the site of Llanfrechfa Grange Hospital on the eastern side of Cwmbran.  It is managed by Aneurin Bevan University Health Board.

History
The hospital, which was designed by the Building Design Partnership and built by Laing O'Rourke at a cost of £350 million, opened on 17 November 2020. Facilities include 470 beds and a 24-hour emergency department and assessment unit.

Space for 384 beds was opened in April 2020, a year in advance of schedule, in case they were needed for the COVID-19 pandemic in Wales, enabled by the extensive adoption of offsite fabrication. The hospital opened in full on 17 November 2020.

References

External links
Grange University Hospital

Cwmbran
NHS hospitals in Wales
Hospitals in Torfaen

Aneurin Bevan University Health Board